Len Ryan Wiseman (born March 4, 1973) is an American filmmaker. He is best known for his work on the Underworld series, Live Free or Die Hard, and the 2012 film Total Recall. Wiseman runs the production company Sketch Films.

Early life and education
Wiseman was born and raised in Fremont, California. He attended American High School and later studied film at De Anza College in Cupertino, California.

Career
Wiseman began his career in film as a property assistant on a number of Roland Emmerich films: Stargate (1994); Independence Day (1996); and Godzilla (1998). After creating advertisements for clients including Sony, he directed music videos for artists such as Megadeth, En Vogue and, Static-X. He received a Best Art Direction nomination for Quarashi's "Stick 'Em Up" at the 2002 MTV Video Music Awards and a Best Director nomination for Rufus Wainwright's "Across the Universe" at the Music Video Production Association (MVPA) Awards.

In 2003, Wiseman co-created and directed the film Underworld. Despite receiving generally negative reviews from critics, the film did well at the box office. He directed the 2006 sequel Underworld: Evolution, and produced the follow-ups Underworld: Rise of the Lycans, Underworld: Awakening, and Underworld: Blood Wars.

In 2007, he directed the fourth installment of the Die Hard series, Live Free or Die Hard, starring Bruce Willis, which opened to generally favorable reviews and box office success. He directed the 2012 release Total Recall, which starred Colin Farrell, Jessica Biel, and his wife Kate Beckinsale. In 2013, it was announced that Wiseman would direct a live action film version of the comic book series The Darkness (though no updates have been announced as of March 2016).

Wiseman has also directed the pilot episodes of three television series—the 2010 launch of CBS's Hawaii Five-0, the 2013 pilot of Fox's Sleepy Hollow, and the 2016 pilot of Fox series Lucifer. All three series were picked up for ongoing production, though Wiseman was not involved in further episodes.

It was announced on October 8, 2019 that Wiseman will direct the John Wick female-centric spinoff film titled Ballerina.

Personal life
Wiseman's first marriage was to a kindergarten teacher named Dana. They divorced in 2003 after Wiseman met actor Kate Beckinsale on the set of his 2003 release Underworld. Beckinsale also ended a relationship with her partner Michael Sheen.

Wiseman and Beckinsale were married on May 9, 2004, in Bel-Air, Los Angeles, California. On November 20, 2015, it was announced that they were separating and in 2016, he filed for divorce, citing "irreconcilable differences". As of November 2019, their divorce was finalized.

Filmography

Films

Television series

Music videos

Commercials 
 Sony
 PlayStation
 Nintendo DS
 Metroid Prime Hunters

References

External links

1973 births
American music video directors
American male screenwriters
De Anza College alumni
Living people
Film directors from California
American film producers
Action film directors
Horror film directors
Film producers from California
People from Fremont, California
American television directors
Screenwriters from California